The Supreme Council for Civil Personnel Selection (Anótato Symvoúlio Epilogís Prosopikoú, ASEP), is an independent commission in Greece that selects people for work in the public sector.

The Council is supervised by the Ministry of Administrative Reform and e-Governance, but is not under government control.

Organisational structure 
ASEP is composed by the following structure:
 Chairman
 Two vice presidents
 21 advisers

Individuals selected to become ASEP's organisational structure are usually those who work in the following positions:
 members of the high judiciary
 employees or heads of the government's main departments
 employees, professors, or assistant professors of higher education institutions
 heads of public entities and other legal persons of the public sector

Roles 
ASEP exclusively performs the following tasks
 Selection of permanent and part-time personnel for the public sector. 
 Control of institutions in the public sector that choose permanent and seasonal/contract agents personnel
 Conduct of written competition for the teachers

External links 
ASEP main website (in Greek)
ASEP English home page

Government agencies of Greece
1994 establishments in Greece
National civil service commissions